Saint Blaise of Amorion (Amorium) was a medieval monk from the Byzantine Empire. 
He was born in the mid-9th century in Amorion, Anatolic Theme. He studied in Constantinople and was ordained a deacon at Hagia Sophia. On a pilgrimage to Rome, he was taken captive and sold to "Scythians" (i.e. Bulgarians) by his travel companion. According to his "Vita", his buyer was a Bulgar nobleman, who released him in the hope that Blaise would stay and provide guidance in how to life a Christian life. He made his way to Rome, where he became a monk  for 18 years, during which he became famous for his piety. He went back to Constantinople to escape his growing reputation of holiness and was welcomed in the Stoudios Monastery, and he later moved to Athos. He died in 908 on a visit to Constantinople.

Notes

References
 BHG 278 = Βίος τοῦ ὁσίου πατρὸς ἡμῶν Βλασίου, ed.  H. Delehaye,  AASS. Nov. IV (1925), 657–669.
 Henri Grégoire, « La vie de Saint Blaise D'Amorium », Byzantion, vol. V, 1929–1930, p. 391-414 (ISSN 0378-2506)
 " Житие за Власий Аморийски // Vita Blasii Amoriensis" in ГРЪЦКИ ИЗВОРИ ЗА БЪЛГАРСКАТА ИСТОРИЯ  FONTES GRAECI HISTORIAE BULGARICAE Vol. 5, Издание на Българската Академия на Науките, Sofija 1964, 14-18 
 Michael MCCormick, Origins of the European Economy. Connections and Trade. 300-900 A.D. Cambridge University Press, 2001. Pages 202-208 (Part II, chapter 7, paragraph 3)

9th-century births
908 deaths
10th-century Christian saints
9th-century Byzantine monks
10th-century Byzantine monks
Byzantine saints of the Eastern Orthodox Church
Saints from Anatolia
Year of birth unknown
People from Amorium
Studite monks
People associated with Mount Athos